Arawa was one of the great ocean-going, voyaging canoes in Māori traditions that was used in the migrations that settled New Zealand.

The Te Arawa confederation of Māori iwi and hapū based in the Rotorua and Bay of Plenty areas trace their ancestry from the people of this canoe.

Background
Te Arawa's ancestors on board the Arawa were of the Ngāti Ohomairangi of Ra'iātea Island. Following a battle that broke out between them and Uenuku, in which their own Whakatūria fell in battle, Tama-te-kapua promised to captain the voyage to the islands of New Zealand, which had been discovered by Ngāhue of the Tāwhirirangi canoe.

Construction of the canoe

A large tree was cut down by four men called Rata, Wahieroa, Ngāhue and Parata, to make the waka which came to be known as Arawa. "Hauhau-te-rangi" and "Tuutauru" (made from New Zealand greenstone brought back by Ngāhue) were the adzes used for the time-consuming and intensive work. Upon completion, the waka was given the name Ngā rākau kotahi puu a Atua Matua (also known as Ngā rākau maatahi puu a Atua Matua, or more simply Ngā rākau rua a Atuamatua - the two trunks of Atuamatua) in memory of Tama-te-kapua's grandfather Atua-matua.

The waka was completed and berthed in Whenuakura Bay while Tama-te-kapua, chief of the canoe, attempted to find a priest for the journey. Ngātoro-i-rangi and his wife Kearoa were tricked by Tama-te-kapua into boarding the canoe to perform the necessary appeasement incantations to the gods before the canoe departed. However, while they were on board, Tama-te-kapua signalled to his men to quickly set sail, and before Ngātoro-i-rangi and his wife could react they were far out to sea.

Voyage to Aotearoa
During the voyage to New Zealand, Tama-te-kapua became desirous of Kearoa. Ngātoro-i-rangi noticed this and took guarded his wife during the night while he was on deck navigating, by tying one end of a cord to her hair and holding the other end in his hand. However, Tama-te-kapua untied the cord from Kearoa's hair and attached it to the bed in order to have sex with her, repeating this over a number of nights. One night he was nearly caught in the act by Ngātoro-i-rangi, but managed to escape, though forgetting the cord in his haste. Ngātoro-i-rangi found the cord and deduced that Tama-te-kapua had been with Kearoa. In revenge, he raised a huge whirlpool in the sea named Te korokoro-o-te-Parata ('The throat of Te Parata'). The waka was about to be lost with all on board, before Ngātoro-i-rangi took mercy and calmed the seas. 

During these events, all the kūmara on board the canoe were lost overboard, except a few in a small kete being held by Whakaotirangi. After the calming of the seas, a shark (known as an arawa) was seen in the water. Ngātoro-i-rangi renamed the waka Te Arawa, after this shark, which then accompanied the waka to Aotearoa, acting as a kai-tiaki (guardian).

The Arawa canoe then continued to New Zealand without incident, finally sighting land at Whangaparaoa, where feather headdresses were cast away due to greed and the beauty of the pohutukawa bloom. On landfall, an argument took place with members of the Tainui canoe over the ownership of a beached whale. Tama-te-kapua again used deceit to take possession of the whale despite the rightful claim of the Tainui. The canoe then travelled north up the coast to the Coromandel Peninsula, where Tama-te-kapua first sighted the mountain Moehau, where he later made his home. Heading south again, the canoe finally came to rest at Maketu, where it was beached and stood until being burnt by Raumati of Taranaki some years later.

Items brought to New Zealand on the Arawa, other than the kūmara saved by Whakaotirangi, included a tapu kōhatu (stone) left by Ngātoro-i-rangi on the island Te Poito o te Kupenga a Taramainuku just off the coast of Cape Colville. This stone held the mauri to protect the Arawa peoples and their descendants from evil. In addition, the canoe brought over two gods, one called Itupaoa, which was represented by a roll of tapa, and another stone carving now possibly buried at Mokoia Island on Lake Rotorua.

See also
List of Māori waka

References

Bibliography
Best, E.  (1982).  Maori Religion and Mythology Part 2.  Museum of Australia Te Papa Tongarewa.
Craig, R.D. Dictionary of Polynesian Mythology (Greenwood Press: New York, 1989), 24.
Grey, G. Polynesian Mythology, Illustrated edition, reprinted 1976. (Whitcombe and Tombs: Christchurch), 1956.
Jones, P.T.H. (1995).  Nga Iwi o Tainui.  Auckland University Press.  Auckland.
Stafford, D.M. (1967).  Te Arawa: A History of the Arawa People.  A.H. & A.W. Reed.  Rotorua, New Zealand.
Steedman, J.A.W.  He Toto: Te Ahu Matua a Nga Tupuna.  (Date of publication and publisher unknown)
Taiapa, J. (2002).  150.114 He Tirohanga o Mua:  Maori Culture - Study Guide.  School of Maori Studies, Massey University, Albany.
Wilson, J.  (Ed).  (1990).  He Korero Purakau mo Nga Taunahanahatanga a Nga Tupuna: Place Names of the Ancestors: A Maori Oral History Atlas.  N.Z. Geographic Board, Wellington.

 
Māori waka
Māori mythology